Građanski košarkaški klub Šibenka, commonly referred to as GKK Šibenka or simply Šibenka, is a men's professional basketball club from Šibenik, Croatia, that plays in the Croatian League and the Alpe Adria Cup.

The club considers itself a successor to notable and folded KK Šibenik.

History
The club was founded on 2 November 2010 under the name of Šibenik Stari Grad. In August 2011, the club changed its name to GKK Šibenik. As famous club, KK Šibenik, bankrupted, GKK Šibenik competed with local Jolly Šibenik to become most popular basketball club in town, carrying the legendary club's colors and playing in the same basketball hall, Baldekin. GKK Šibenik won the sympathies of many Šibenik residents who now see the club as a successor to the famous KK Šibenik.

In 2012–13 season of the second-tier A-2 Liga, the club came first being promoted to the A-1 League. Today, they also plays in the first tier of the Croatian basketball league system, HT Premijer liga. In September 2016, the club management announced replacing Jeronimo Šarin with Vladimir Anzulović as head coach, and signing Miralem Halilović, Ive Ivanov, Luka Pandurić, and Ivan Siriščević. Lastly, the club finished in third in the domestic league season, defeating Zagreb in the playoffs quarter-finals, and losing to powerhouse, Cibona, in the semifinals of the 2016–17 A-1 League playoffs. In the next season, the club finished in fifth place after losing in the quarter-finals of the championship playoffs to Split. Head coach Anzulović left bench, which was taken by his former assistant, Miro Jurić.

On 13 June 2019, after domestic league season was finished, a longtime main sponsor, Doğuş Group, announced that they will leave the club after six years of the partnership. On 27 June, the club confirmed and presented newly formed board led by its president, Ante Burić. On 6 August, the club management announced the club has changed name to GKK Šibenka (Građanski košarkaški klub Šibenka fully).

Home arena
Šibenka plays their home games at the Baldekin Sports Hall, which is located in Šibenik. The arena was opened in 1973. It has a seating capacity of 900 or 1,726 if needed.

Honours

Domestic competitions
First Men's League
 Winners (1): 2012–13

Players

Current roster

Depth chart

Head coaches

  Jeronimo Šarin (2010–2016)
  Vladimir Anzulović (2016–2018)
  Miro Jurić (2018–2019)
  Edi Dželalija (2019–2020)
  Dženan Rahimić (2020–2021)
  Damir Milačić (2021–present)

Management

Notable players 
 Roko Badžim
 Domagoj Bašić
 Ivan Blaće 
 Filip Bundović
 Vladimir Dašić
 Georgios Diamantakos
 Nikola Došen
 Trey Freeman 
 Tomislav Gabrić
 Miralem Halilović
 Ive Ivanov 
 Martin Junaković 
 Franko Kaštropil 
 Nikola Korač
 Milija Miković
 Ivan Mileković
 Ozren Mišić
 Toni Nakić
 Teo Petani
 Krešimir Radovčić
 Ivan Siriščević 
 Nik Slavica
 Ljubo Šamadan
 Henrik Širko
 İzzet Türkyılmaz
 Toni Vitali
 Jakov Vladović
 Zoran Vrkić
 Filip Vukičević

See also
KK Šibenik
ŽKK Šibenik

Notes

References

External links

GKK Sibenka
Basketball teams in Croatia
Basketball teams established in 2010
2010 establishments in Croatia